The 16th Grand National Assembly of Turkey existed from 5 June 1977 to 12 September 1980. 
There were 450 MPs in the lower house. Republican People's Party (CHP) held the plurality. Justice Party (AP) was the next party. National Salvation Party (MSP), Nationalist Movement Party (MHP), Republican Reliance Party and Democratic Party (DP) were the other parties.

Main parliamentary milestones 
Some of the important events in the history of the parliament are the following:
21 June 1977  – Bülent Ecevit of CHP formed the 40th government of Turkey
3 July 1977 – The government couldn't receive the vote of confidence
21 July 1977 – Süleyman Demirel of AP formed the 41st government of Turkey, a coalition of AP, MSP, CGP and MHP so-called Second National Front
17 November 1977 – Following a crises of 6 months, Cahit Karakaş of CHP was elected as the speaker of the parliament
31 December 1977 – Non confidence vote following interpellation
5 January 1978 – Bülent Ecevit formed the 42nd government of Turkey; a coalition of CHP, CGP, DP and the independents
12 November 1979 – Süleyman Demirel formed the 43rd government of Turkey; a minority government with external support
7 April 1980 –  Fahri Korutürk, the sixth president of Turkey left the office after his 7-year legal term of office. His post was not filled till 12 September. İhsan Sabri Çağlayangil became the acting president
12 September 1980 – 1980 Turkish coup d'état

References

1977 establishments in Turkey
1980 disestablishments in Turkey
Terms of the Grand National Assembly of Turkey
16th parliament of Turkey
Republican People's Party (Turkey)
Justice Party (Turkey)
Nationalist Movement Party
Republican Reliance Party
Democratic Party (Turkey, 1970)
National Salvation Party
Political history of Turkey